James P. "Jim" Roers is an American politician and businessman serving as a member of the North Dakota Senate from the 46th district. He assumed office on December 1, 2016.

Early life and education 
Roers was born in Alexandria, Minnesota and raised in Fargo, North Dakota. He earned a Bachelor of Science degree in agriculture from North Dakota State University.

Career 
Roers is the president of Roers Development, a property development company. He was appointed to the North Dakota Senate in April 2012, succeeding Tom Fischer, and served until December 2012. He was elected to the Senate in November 2016. Roers has also served as vice chair of the Senate Energy and Natural Resources Committee.

Personal life 
Roers and his wife, Sandra, have five children, including Shannon Roers Jones.

References 

Living people
Republican Party North Dakota state senators
People from Alexandria, Minnesota
People from Fargo, North Dakota
Politicians from Fargo, North Dakota
North Dakota State University alumni
Year of birth missing (living people)